The Protection of Stocking Frames, etc. Act 1788 (28 Geo. 3 c. 55) was an Act of Parliament passed by the British Government in 1788 and aimed at increasing the penalties for the deliberate disruption of the activity of mechanical knitting machines (stocking frames).

Contents
Section one of the Act made failure to return frames that had been hired from their owner punishable with a fine, whilst section two made unlawfully disposing of hired frames punishable with imprisonment, and section three made the purchaser equally culpable if he or she knew the frames were not the property of the seller. The final (and most strongly worded) section of the Act, section four, made the outright destruction of the frames a felony punishable by 7 to 14 years transportation. The Act also included the same penalty for entering by force with the intent to destroy frames or their associated paraphernalia. It was established in later case law that theft of items integral to the correct functioning of the machines (even if they were not damaged) was sufficient to meet the threshold for the Act.

The Act described itself as a response to the malicious theft of frames, and the propensity for "discontents ... and other disorderly persons [to] have assembled in a riotous and tumultuous manner and have destroyed or materially damaged great numbers of stocking frames". Daniel Coke, Member of Parliament for Nottingham, spoke on behalf of the bill in the Commons, citing disturbances in the town and pointing to previous legislation aimed at similar disruption in the wool trade. Coke originally proposed that machine-breaking carry the death penalty, but was later forced to abandon this, seeing the request "overwhelmingly rejected" by Parliament. The Act was eventually passed and received royal assent on 25 June 1788.

Significance
Later Acts, such as the Destruction of Stocking Frames, etc. Act 1812, temporarily allowed judges to administer the death penalty for the crime of damaging frames, citing the "ineffectual" nature of the lesser punishments set out in section four of the 1788 Act. Section four of the 1788 Act was officially repealed by the Capital Punishments, etc. Act 1823 (4 Geo. 4 c. 46), which, whilst not removing the possibility of transportation, gave judges additional room to sentence offenders to alternative punishments such as imprisonment.

See also
UK labour law
Luddite

References

External links 
 Full text of the statute

Great Britain Acts of Parliament 1788
1788 in economics